Frederick or Fred Thomas may refer to:

Sportspeople
Fred Thomas (manager), Major League Baseball manager of the 1887 Indianapolis Hoosiers
Fred Thomas (third baseman) (1892–1986), Major League Baseball player
Fred Thomas (cornerback) (born 1973), former American football cornerback
Frederick Hall Thomas (1886–1927), birth name of boxer Freddie Welsh
Fred Thomas (wrestler) (born 1938), former wrestler from New Zealand
Freddie Thomas (1917–2003), Scottish cricketer
Fred Thomas (American football coach), American football coach
Fred Thomas (athlete) (1923–1981), Canadian multi-sport athlete

Politicians
Frederick William Thomas (politician), Lord Mayor of Melbourne
Fred Thomas (Australian politician) (1882–1960), Australian politician
Fred A. Thomas (1865–1958), Montana State Representative
Fred Thomas (Montana politician) (born 1958), Majority Leader of the Montana Senate

Others
Frederick Bruce Thomas (1872–1928), son of former Mississippi slaves who became a prominent citizen of Moscow and, later, Constantinople
Frederick William Thomas (writer) (1806–1866), American writer
Frederick William Thomas (philologist) (1867–1956), Indologist and Tibetologist
Fred Thomas (bassist), bassist best known for his work with James Brown
Fred Thomas (rock musician) (born 1976), indie rock musician best known for starting the band Saturday Looks Good to Me
F. W. L. Thomas (Frederick William Leopold Thomas, c. 1812–1885), Royal Navy officer, photographer, and historian

See also
Frédéric Thomas (disambiguation)